Geoffrey Blancaneaux (born 8 August 1998) is a French tennis player.

Blancaneaux has a career-high ATP singles ranking of World No. 134 achieved on 14 November 2022 and a doubles ranking of World No. 164 achieved on 18 July 2022.

Junior Career
Blancaneaux won the 2016 French Open boys' singles title, defeating Félix Auger-Aliassime in the final.

Professional career

2017: Grand Slam debut
In September 2017, Blancaneaux made his Grand Slam debut, after receiving a wildcard to enter the main draw at the US Open.

2021: First Challenger win
In December 2021, Blancaneaux won his first Challenger Singles tournament at the Maia Challenger, defeating Tseng Chun-hsin in the finals.

2022: French Open, Masters and top 150 debuts
Seeded No. 190 at the 2022 French Open he qualified to make his Grand Slam debut at this Major in his sixth attempt.

He reached the top 150 on 8 August 2022.

In October, Blancaneaux made his Masters debut, after receiving a wildcard to enter the qualifications at the 2022 Rolex Paris Masters.

Junior Grand Slam finals

Singles: 1 (1 title)

Performance timeline

Singles

ATP Challenger and ITF Futures/World Tennis Tour finals

Singles: 17 (14–3)

Doubles: 13 (7–6)

References

External links
 
 

1998 births
Living people
French male tennis players
Tennis players from Paris
French Open junior champions
Grand Slam (tennis) champions in boys' singles